Atlantic Avenue is a proposed Tri-Rail Coastal Link Green Line station in Delray Beach, Florida. The station is slated for construction on the north side of Atlantic Avenue (SR 806) between Northeast 2nd Avenue and Northeast 3rd Avenue, just west of Federal Highway (US 1).

References

External links
 Proposed site in Google Maps Street View

Tri-Rail stations in Palm Beach County, Florida
Proposed Tri-Rail stations
Delray Beach, Florida